The Chinese Football Association Member Association Champions League (Simplified Chinese: 中国足球协会会员协会冠军联赛), or CMCL, former known as  Chinese Football Association Bing League (中国足球协会丙级联赛) (before 2006) and Chinese Football Association Amateur League (中国足球协会业余联赛) (2006–2017), is the fourth-tier football league of the People's Republic of China. The league is under the auspices of the Chinese Football Association.

Winners

Notable Participants

Feeder leagues 

 Changchun Amateur League
 Chengdu City League Super League
 Chongqing Amateur League Super Division
 Dalian City League Group A
 Fujian FA Super League
 Gansu Super League
 Guangdong FA Super League
 Guangxi Super League
 Guangzhou City League
 Hainan Football Super League
 Hebei League
 Henan Amateur Championship League Division A
 Heilongjiang FA Super League
 Hubei Mass League
 Inner Mongolia Male Super League
 Jiangsu FA Championship League
 Jiangxi FA Super League
 Liaoning FA Amateur Super League
 Nanjing FA Super League
 Ningxia FA Super League
 Qingdao City Super League
 Qinghai Super League
 Shaanxi National Super League
 Shandong Amateur Super League
 Shanghai FA Super League Group A
 Shanxi FA Super League
 Shenzhen FA City Super League
 Sichuan Amateur League
 Tianjin FA Super League
 Wuhan City Super League
 Xiamen FA Super League
 Xinjiang FA Champions League
 Zhejiang Super League

References

 League Three on RSSSF

4
Fourth level football leagues in Asia
Sports leagues established in 2002
2002 establishments in China
Sports leagues in China
Professional sports leagues in China